"Beautiful" is the third single from Akon's third studio album, Freedom. The song features American pop singer Colby O'Donis and a rap verse from Canadian rapper Kardinal Offishall. "Beautiful" was released to radio on January 6, 2009. The song has also been released in other three international versions, with different featured artists replacing both Colby's vocals and Kardinal's rapping: in Portuguese with Brazilian singer Negra Li, in Dutch with Dutch singer Brace, and in Spanish with Mexican singer Dulce María.
The original version peaked at number nineteen on the Billboard Hot 100. Outside of the United States, the original version peaked within the top ten of the charts in Israel and the United Kingdom.

Different versions
The song has also been recorded in three international versions: in Portuguese, with Brazilian singer and actress Negra Li, in Dutch, with Dutch singer Brace, and in Spanish, with Mexican singer/actress/songwriter Dulce María. The rap from the original was removed, and Colby O'Donis' vocals were also removed in favor of the other singers.

The Spanish version was first performed in an event at Mexico, on April 1, 2009. On the next day, it was leaked for airing and on the internet. The Portuguese version was leaked two days before.

The music videos in Portuguese, Dutch and Spanish were released at YouTube on June 2, 8 and 9, respectively.

Track listing
UK and Europe CD single
 "Beautiful" (featuring Colby O'Donis and Kardinal Offishall) - 5:13
 "I'm So Paid" (featuring Lil Wayne and Young Jeezy) - 4:29

Brazil CD single
 "Beautiful" (featuring Negra Li) - 4:07
 "Beautiful" (featuring Negra Li) [Dance Mix] - 4:01

Mexico CD single
 "Beautiful" (featuring Dulce Maria) - 4:06

Korea CD single
 "Beautiful" (featuring BoA) - 4:06

Charts and certifications

Weekly charts

Monthly charts

Year-end charts

Certifications

References

2009 singles
Akon songs
Songs written by Akon
Song recordings produced by Akon
Kardinal Offishall songs
Music videos directed by Gil Green
Songs written by Kardinal Offishall
2009 songs
Songs written by Giorgio Tuinfort
Universal Motown Records singles
Songs containing the I–V-vi-IV progression